Miguel Ángel Fuentes Azpiroz (born 6 August 1964) is a Spanish retired footballer who played mainly as a right back.

He spent his entire professional career with Real Sociedad, appearing in nearly 500 competitive matches, among the highest totals in its history. He later served as the club's president.

Playing career

Club
Born in San Sebastián, Gipuzkoa, Basque Country, Fuentes joined Real Sociedad's youth setup in 1979 from La Salle CD. Released the following year, he returned to Sanse in 1981, finishing his formation in 1983 but being deemed surplus to requirements again shortly after.

Fuentes subsequently signed for Tercera División club SD Eibar, achieving promotion to Segunda División B in 1986 and being an ever-present figure in the following season as his team nearly achieved another promotion. During that period, he played as a forward or winger. 

Fuentes returned to Real Sociedad in the summer of 1987, now being assigned to the main squad in La Liga. He made his professional debut on 30 August by coming on as a substitute in a 1–0 away loss against Real Zaragoza, and made 24 league appearances during the campaign as the side finished runners-up behind Real Madrid, also coming off the bench in the final of the Copa del Rey which ended with a narrow defeat to FC Barcelona. In what was a transitional period for the club as their successful squad of the decade began to break up, they reached the quarter-finals of the 1988–89 UEFA Cup but lost out to VfB Stuttgart in a penalty shootout with the player, again introduced as a substitute, missing a good chance to win the tie; it was around that time that he was converted into a right back by manager John Toshack. 

Fuentes established himself as a starter for the Txuri-urdin from 1989–90 onwards. He played his last match on 17 June 2001 at the age of 36, replacing Tayfun Korkut in a 0–1 home defeat to CA Osasuna.

International
Fuentes won one cap for the unofficial Basque Country regional team, in a 1–1 friendly draw to Paraguay on 22 December 1995 held at the San Mamés Stadium.

Post-retirement
Fuentes majored in management. From July 2005 to June 2007 he acted as president to Real Sociedad, quitting his post due to personal reasons with the team on the verge of relegation, an eventuality which was confirmed a few weeks later. He was replaced in the interim by María de la Peña, the first woman to hold such a position at the club, albeit she stepped aside a matter of months afterwards to be succeeded by Iñaki Badiola.

Personal life
Fuentes' younger brother, Juan Luis (one year his junior), was also a footballer. A midfielder, he played professionally for Sestao Sport Club and was employed in several roles by Athletic Bilbao including as head coach of their women's team.

Fuentes' nephews, Luca and Marco Sangalli, also represented Real Sociedad professionally.

Honours
Eibar
Tercera División: 1985–86

See also
 List of La Liga players (400+ appearances)

References

External links

1964 births
Living people
Footballers from San Sebastián
Spanish footballers
Association football defenders
Association football forwards
Association football utility players
La Liga players
Segunda División B players
Tercera División players 
SD Eibar footballers
Real Sociedad footballers
Basque Country international footballers
Real Sociedad non-playing staff
Spanish football chairmen and investors